The 2002–03 Atlanta Thrashers season was the Thrashers' fourth season. The Thrashers placed third in the Southeast, eleventh in the East to miss the playoffs.

Offseason
The Thrashers initially rotated the team captaincy among four players — Vyacheslav Kozlov, Uwe Krupp, Shawn McEachern, and Jeff Odgers.

Regular season
After a poor start to the season saw the Thrashers with the worst record in the league, head coach Curt Fraser was fired on December 26. Recently fired Colorado Avalanche head coach Bob Hartley was named his replacement on January 15. The rotating captaincy was discontinued two days later when McEachern was named permanent captain.

The Thrashers struggled defensively, allowing the most goals (284) and the most short-handed goals (14) of any team in the league.

Final standings

Schedule and results

|- align="center" bgcolor="#FFBBBB"
|1||L||October 11, 2002||3–5 || align="left"| @ Carolina Hurricanes (2002–03) ||0–1–0–0 || 
|- align="center" bgcolor="#FF6F6F"
|2||OTL||October 12, 2002||4–5 OT|| align="left"|  Florida Panthers (2002–03) ||0–1–0–1 || 
|- align="center" bgcolor="#FFBBBB"
|3||L||October 16, 2002||2–3 || align="left"| @ Pittsburgh Penguins (2002–03) ||0–2–0–1 || 
|- align="center" bgcolor="#FFBBBB"
|4||L||October 18, 2002||5–8 || align="left"| @ Tampa Bay Lightning (2002–03) ||0–3–0–1 || 
|- align="center" bgcolor="#FFBBBB"
|5||L||October 19, 2002||4–5 || align="left"|  New York Islanders (2002–03) ||0–4–0–1 || 
|- align="center" bgcolor="#FFBBBB"
|6||L||October 21, 2002||2–3 || align="left"| @ Florida Panthers (2002–03) ||0–5–0–1 || 
|- align="center" bgcolor="#FFBBBB"
|7||L||October 23, 2002||1–2 || align="left"|  New Jersey Devils (2002–03) ||0–6–0–1 || 
|- align="center" bgcolor="#FFBBBB"
|8||L||October 26, 2002||3–4 || align="left"| @ Boston Bruins (2002–03) ||0–7–0–1 || 
|- align="center" bgcolor="#FFBBBB"
|9||L||October 29, 2002||0–4 || align="left"|  Los Angeles Kings (2002–03) ||0–8–0–1 || 
|- align="center" 
|10||T||October 31, 2002||3–3 OT|| align="left"| @ Toronto Maple Leafs (2002–03) ||0–8–1–1 || 
|-

|- align="center" bgcolor="#CCFFCC" 
|11||W||November 2, 2002||3–1 || align="left"| @ Florida Panthers (2002–03) ||1–8–1–1 || 
|- align="center" bgcolor="#FFBBBB"
|12||L||November 7, 2002||0–5 || align="left"| @ Chicago Blackhawks (2002–03) ||1–9–1–1 || 
|- align="center" bgcolor="#CCFFCC" 
|13||W||November 9, 2002||6–4 || align="left"| @ Buffalo Sabres (2002–03) ||2–9–1–1 || 
|- align="center" bgcolor="#CCFFCC" 
|14||W||November 11, 2002||2–1 || align="left"|  Calgary Flames (2002–03) ||3–9–1–1 || 
|- align="center" bgcolor="#CCFFCC" 
|15||W||November 13, 2002||3–2 OT|| align="left"|  San Jose Sharks (2002–03) ||4–9–1–1 || 
|- align="center" bgcolor="#FFBBBB"
|16||L||November 15, 2002||1–5 || align="left"|  Phoenix Coyotes (2002–03) ||4–10–1–1 || 
|- align="center" bgcolor="#FFBBBB"
|17||L||November 17, 2002||1–5 || align="left"|  Mighty Ducks of Anaheim (2002–03) ||4–11–1–1 || 
|- align="center" bgcolor="#CCFFCC" 
|18||W||November 19, 2002||4–3 OT|| align="left"|  Florida Panthers (2002–03) ||5–11–1–1 || 
|- align="center" bgcolor="#FFBBBB"
|19||L||November 22, 2002||1–3 || align="left"|  Pittsburgh Penguins (2002–03) ||5–12–1–1 || 
|- align="center" bgcolor="#FFBBBB"
|20||L||November 23, 2002||3–6 || align="left"| @ Washington Capitals (2002–03) ||5–13–1–1 || 
|- align="center" bgcolor="#FFBBBB"
|21||L||November 26, 2002||2–3 || align="left"| @ Montreal Canadiens (2002–03) ||5–14–1–1 || 
|- align="center" bgcolor="#CCFFCC" 
|22||W||November 28, 2002||7–4 || align="left"|  New York Rangers (2002–03) ||6–14–1–1 || 
|-

|- align="center" bgcolor="#CCFFCC" 
|23||W||December 1, 2002||5–4 || align="left"|  Washington Capitals (2002–03) ||7–14–1–1 || 
|- align="center" bgcolor="#FF6F6F"
|24||OTL||December 5, 2002||3–4 OT|| align="left"| @ Boston Bruins (2002–03) ||7–14–1–2 || 
|- align="center" bgcolor="#FF6F6F"
|25||OTL||December 6, 2002||6–7 OT|| align="left"| @ Washington Capitals (2002–03) ||7–14–1–3 || 
|- align="center" bgcolor="#FFBBBB"
|26||L||December 8, 2002||0–3 || align="left"|  Edmonton Oilers (2002–03) ||7–15–1–3 || 
|- align="center" bgcolor="#FFBBBB"
|27||L||December 11, 2002||2–4 || align="left"| @ Phoenix Coyotes (2002–03) ||7–16–1–3 || 
|- align="center" bgcolor="#FFBBBB"
|28||L||December 13, 2002||1–3 || align="left"| @ Dallas Stars (2002–03) ||7–17–1–3 || 
|- align="center" bgcolor="#FFBBBB"
|29||L||December 14, 2002||0–4 || align="left"| @ St. Louis Blues (2002–03) ||7–18–1–3 || 
|- align="center" bgcolor="#CCFFCC" 
|30||W||December 16, 2002||1–0 || align="left"|  Toronto Maple Leafs (2002–03) ||8–18–1–3 || 
|- align="center" bgcolor="#FFBBBB"
|31||L||December 18, 2002||1–3 || align="left"|  Philadelphia Flyers (2002–03) ||8–19–1–3 || 
|- align="center" bgcolor="#FF6F6F"
|32||OTL||December 20, 2002||2–3 OT|| align="left"|  Carolina Hurricanes (2002–03) ||8–19–1–4 || 
|- align="center" bgcolor="#FFBBBB"
|33||L||December 23, 2002||1–5 || align="left"| @ Toronto Maple Leafs (2002–03) ||8–20–1–4 || 
|- align="center" bgcolor="#CCFFCC" 
|34||W||December 27, 2002||5–3 || align="left"| @ Carolina Hurricanes (2002–03) ||9–20–1–4 || 
|- align="center" bgcolor="#FFBBBB"
|35||L||December 28, 2002||0–1 || align="left"|  Boston Bruins (2002–03) ||9–21–1–4 || 
|- align="center" bgcolor="#CCFFCC" 
|36||W||December 30, 2002||3–2 OT|| align="left"| @ Pittsburgh Penguins (2002–03) ||10–21–1–4 || 
|-

|- align="center" bgcolor="#FFBBBB"
|37||L||January 2, 2003||1–8 || align="left"| @ Ottawa Senators (2002–03) ||10–22–1–4 || 
|- align="center" bgcolor="#FFBBBB"
|38||L||January 3, 2003||1–4 || align="left"|  Pittsburgh Penguins (2002–03) ||10–23–1–4 || 
|- align="center" bgcolor="#FFBBBB"
|39||L||January 5, 2003||4–5 || align="left"|  Philadelphia Flyers (2002–03) ||10–24–1–4 || 
|- align="center" 
|40||T||January 7, 2003||3–3 OT|| align="left"|  Carolina Hurricanes (2002–03) ||10–24–2–4 || 
|- align="center" bgcolor="#CCFFCC" 
|41||W||January 9, 2003||3–2 OT|| align="left"| @ Tampa Bay Lightning (2002–03) ||11–24–2–4 || 
|- align="center" bgcolor="#FFBBBB"
|42||L||January 11, 2003||3–7 || align="left"| @ New York Islanders (2002–03) ||11–25–2–4 || 
|- align="center" bgcolor="#CCFFCC" 
|43||W||January 13, 2003||7–4 || align="left"| @ Philadelphia Flyers (2002–03) ||12–25–2–4 || 
|- align="center" bgcolor="#CCFFCC" 
|44||W||January 15, 2003||1–0 || align="left"|  Montreal Canadiens (2002–03) ||13–25–2–4 || 
|- align="center" bgcolor="#CCFFCC" 
|45||W||January 17, 2003||3–1 || align="left"|  Boston Bruins (2002–03) ||14–25–2–4 || 
|- align="center" bgcolor="#FFBBBB"
|46||L||January 19, 2003||1–4 || align="left"|  New York Islanders (2002–03) ||14–26–2–4 || 
|- align="center" bgcolor="#CCFFCC" 
|47||W||January 21, 2003||8–4 || align="left"|  St. Louis Blues (2002–03) ||15–26–2–4 || 
|- align="center" 
|48||T||January 23, 2003||3–3 OT|| align="left"|  Ottawa Senators (2002–03) ||15–26–3–4 || 
|- align="center" bgcolor="#CCFFCC" 
|49||W||January 25, 2003||4–1 || align="left"| @ New York Rangers (2002–03) ||16–26–3–4 || 
|- align="center" bgcolor="#CCFFCC" 
|50||W||January 28, 2003||5–2 || align="left"|  New York Rangers (2002–03) ||17–26–3–4 || 
|- align="center" bgcolor="#FFBBBB"
|51||L||January 30, 2003||2–5 || align="left"|  Toronto Maple Leafs (2002–03) ||17–27–3–4 || 
|-

|- align="center" bgcolor="#CCFFCC" 
|52||W||February 4, 2003||4–3 || align="left"| @ Montreal Canadiens (2002–03) ||18–27–3–4 || 
|- align="center" bgcolor="#CCFFCC" 
|53||W||February 7, 2003||4–2 || align="left"| @ New Jersey Devils (2002–03) ||19–27–3–4 || 
|- align="center" bgcolor="#FFBBBB"
|54||L||February 8, 2003||1–3 || align="left"| @ Ottawa Senators (2002–03) ||19–28–3–4 || 
|- align="center" bgcolor="#FFBBBB"
|55||L||February 12, 2003||1–5 || align="left"|  Washington Capitals (2002–03) ||19–29–3–4 || 
|- align="center" 
|56||T||February 14, 2003||2–2 OT|| align="left"|  Tampa Bay Lightning (2002–03) ||19–29–4–4 || 
|- align="center" bgcolor="#FFBBBB"
|57||L||February 15, 2003||2–6 || align="left"|  Detroit Red Wings (2002–03) ||19–30–4–4 || 
|- align="center" bgcolor="#CCFFCC" 
|58||W||February 17, 2003||4–3 OT|| align="left"|  Buffalo Sabres (2002–03) ||20–30–4–4 || 
|- align="center" bgcolor="#FFBBBB"
|59||L||February 19, 2003||0–2 || align="left"| @ Tampa Bay Lightning (2002–03) ||20–31–4–4 || 
|- align="center" 
|60||T||February 23, 2003||3–3 OT|| align="left"| @ Edmonton Oilers (2002–03) ||20–31–5–4 || 
|- align="center" bgcolor="#FFBBBB"
|61||L||February 25, 2003||0–8 || align="left"| @ Vancouver Canucks (2002–03) ||20–32–5–4 || 
|- align="center" bgcolor="#CCFFCC" 
|62||W||February 27, 2003||4–3 OT|| align="left"| @ Colorado Avalanche (2002–03) ||21–32–5–4 || 
|-

|- align="center" bgcolor="#FFBBBB"
|63||L||March 1, 2003||1–4 || align="left"| @ Los Angeles Kings (2002–03) ||21–33–5–4 || 
|- align="center" bgcolor="#CCFFCC" 
|64||W||March 2, 2003||4–1 || align="left"| @ Mighty Ducks of Anaheim (2002–03) ||22–33–5–4 || 
|- align="center" 
|65||T||March 6, 2003||4–4 OT|| align="left"| @ Washington Capitals (2002–03) ||22–33–6–4 || 
|- align="center" bgcolor="#FFBBBB"
|66||L||March 7, 2003||1–2 || align="left"|  Florida Panthers (2002–03) ||22–34–6–4 || 
|- align="center" bgcolor="#FFBBBB"
|67||L||March 9, 2003||4–6 || align="left"|  Minnesota Wild (2002–03) ||22–35–6–4 || 
|- align="center" bgcolor="#CCFFCC" 
|68||W||March 11, 2003||3–2 || align="left"| @ New Jersey Devils (2002–03) ||23–35–6–4 || 
|- align="center" bgcolor="#FFBBBB"
|69||L||March 13, 2003||2–4 || align="left"|  Montreal Canadiens (2002–03) ||23–36–6–4 || 
|- align="center" bgcolor="#CCFFCC" 
|70||W||March 15, 2003||5–3 || align="left"|  Buffalo Sabres (2002–03) ||24–36–6–4 || 
|- align="center" bgcolor="#CCFFCC" 
|71||W||March 17, 2003||3–2 || align="left"|  Columbus Blue Jackets (2002–03) ||25–36–6–4 || 
|- align="center" bgcolor="#FF6F6F"
|72||OTL||March 19, 2003||4–5 OT|| align="left"|  Dallas Stars (2002–03) ||25–36–6–5 || 
|- align="center" bgcolor="#FFBBBB"
|73||L||March 21, 2003||1–5 || align="left"|  Ottawa Senators (2002–03) ||25–37–6–5 || 
|- align="center" bgcolor="#CCFFCC" 
|74||W||March 22, 2003||3–2 || align="left"| @ Columbus Blue Jackets (2002–03) ||26–37–6–5 || 
|- align="center" bgcolor="#FFBBBB"
|75||L||March 24, 2003||2–6 || align="left"| @ Philadelphia Flyers (2002–03) ||26–38–6–5 || 
|- align="center" bgcolor="#CCFFCC" 
|76||W||March 26, 2003||5–1 || align="left"|  Carolina Hurricanes (2002–03) ||27–38–6–5 || 
|- align="center" 
|77||T||March 28, 2003||1–1 OT|| align="left"|  New Jersey Devils (2002–03) ||27–38–7–5 || 
|- align="center" bgcolor="#CCFFCC" 
|78||W||March 29, 2003||3–2 || align="left"| @ Nashville Predators (2002–03) ||28–38–7–5 || 
|- align="center" bgcolor="#CCFFCC" 
|79||W||March 31, 2003||4–3 OT|| align="left"| @ New York Rangers (2002–03) ||29–38–7–5 || 
|-

|- align="center" bgcolor="#FFBBBB"
|80||L||April 2, 2003||3–4 || align="left"| @ Buffalo Sabres (2002–03) ||29–39–7–5 || 
|- align="center" bgcolor="#CCFFCC" 
|81||W||April 5, 2003||3–2 || align="left"| @ New York Islanders (2002–03) ||30–39–7–5 || 
|- align="center" bgcolor="#CCFFCC" 
|82||W||April 6, 2003||6–2 || align="left"|  Tampa Bay Lightning (2002–03) ||31–39–7–5 || 
|-

|-
| Legend:

Player statistics

Scoring
 Position abbreviations: C = Center; D = Defense; G = Goaltender; LW = Left Wing; RW = Right Wing
  = Joined team via a transaction (e.g., trade, waivers, signing) during the season. Stats reflect time with the Thrashers only.
  = Left team via a transaction (e.g., trade, waivers, release) during the season. Stats reflect time with the Thrashers only.

Goaltending
  = Joined team via a transaction (e.g., trade, waivers, signing) during the season. Stats reflect time with the Thrashers only.

Awards and records

Awards

Transactions
The Thrashers were involved in the following transactions from June 14, 2002, the day after the deciding game of the 2002 Stanley Cup Finals, through June 9, 2003, the day of the deciding game of the 2003 Stanley Cup Finals.

Trades

Players acquired

Players lost

Signings

Draft picks
Atlanta's draft picks at the 2002 NHL Entry Draft held at the Air Canada Centre in Toronto, Ontario.

Notes

References

Atlanta Thrashers seasons, 2002-03
Atlanta Thrashers seasons, 2002-03
Atlanta Thrashers seasons
Atlanta Thrashers
Atlanta Thrashers